Kingsholme is an affluent rural locality in the City of Gold Coast, Queensland, Australia. In the  Kingsholme had a population of 286 people.

Geography 
The locality is roughly bounded to the west by the Darlington Range.

A small portion of the northeastern boundary of the locality follows the Pacific Motorway.

History
The locality was named by James Murtha circa 1869.  Originally from County Cork, Ireland, he named his property, Kingsholme. Other notable pioneering families included the Thomson family (Alexander Thomson) who emigrated from Scotland in 1889.

Historically, farming families grew bananas, sugar cane and arrowroot.  Some supplemented their farm income with dairying or sawmilling. Today, many former farms have been sub divided.

In the 2011 census, Kingsholme had a population of 281 people.

In the  Kingsholme had a population of 286 people.

Education
There are no schools in Kingsholme. The nearest primary schools are Ormeau State School in neighbouring Ormeau to the north-east and Cedar Creek State School in neighbouring Cedar Creek to the west. The nearest secondary school is Ormeau Woods State High School in Ormeau.

Amenities
Ormeau Rural Fire Station is the southern side of eastern end of Upper Ormeau Road.

There are a number of parks in the locality, including:

 Edward Courbould Reserve And Nature Retreat
 Gerrale Dr Reserve 1

 Gerrale Dr Reserve 2

 Hidden Court Reserve

 Howard Creek Reserve

 Monty Kerkin Environmental Reserve

 Ormeau Hill District Sports Park

 Rocky Creek Conservation Area

 Stage Coach Reserve

 The Grange Environmental Park

 Upper Ormeau Conservation Area

 Upper Ormeau Rd Reserve

 Wongawallan Conservation Area

References

External links
  — includes Kingsholme

Suburbs of the Gold Coast, Queensland
Localities in Queensland